Sergio Sánchez (born 22 August 1970) is a Guatemalan sports shooter. He competed at the 1996 Summer Olympics in 50 meter free pistol where he finished at eighth place. He won gold in the 50 meter pistol at the 2011 Pan American Games. He competed for Guatemala at the 2012 Summer Olympics. He also competed in the modern pentathlon at the 1992 Summer Olympics.

References 

1970 births
Living people
Modern pentathletes at the 1992 Summer Olympics
Shooters at the 1996 Summer Olympics
Shooters at the 2000 Summer Olympics
Shooters at the 2012 Summer Olympics
Shooters at the 2003 Pan American Games
Shooters at the 2011 Pan American Games
Guatemalan male sport shooters
Guatemalan male modern pentathletes
Olympic shooters of Guatemala
Olympic modern pentathletes of Guatemala
Pan American Games gold medalists for Guatemala
Pan American Games medalists in shooting
Shooters at the 2015 Pan American Games

Central American and Caribbean Games silver medalists for Guatemala
Central American and Caribbean Games bronze medalists for Guatemala
Competitors at the 1993 Central American and Caribbean Games
Competitors at the 1998 Central American and Caribbean Games
Competitors at the 2002 Central American and Caribbean Games
Competitors at the 2010 Central American and Caribbean Games
Central American and Caribbean Games gold medalists for Guatemala
Central American and Caribbean Games medalists in shooting
Medalists at the 2011 Pan American Games